The 1950 Wilkes 200 was a NASCAR Grand National Series event that was held on , at North Wilkesboro Speedway in North Wilkesboro, North Carolina.

Due to the mostly informal nature of the NASCAR organization during the early 1950s, certain records like the number of laps completed under a caution flag and the amount of time it took to complete the race were never placed in the league's archives. Lee Petty, Lloyd Moore and Dick Linder mathematically eliminated themselves from the championship by not taking part in this race.

Summary
Fireball Roberts acquired the pole position while driving speeds up to  during the qualifying sessions. However, on the first lap of the race, he was passed by Red Byron. Three laps later, Fonty Flock took over the lead, and would eventually lead over 104 laps before being sidelined with a blown engine. Byron took the lead back, and would lead 30 more laps, but he was sidelined with a broken spindle. Jack Smith would inherit the lead, but with eight laps to go, Leon Sales, in his first start, took over the lead, and would defeat Jack Smith by an unknown margin of victory. Sales would qualify in eleventh place for this racing event. Seven thousand people would watch this race that took place on a dirt track spanning .

All 26 drivers on the starting grid were born in the United States of America; no foreign drivers made the grid. Most of the DNFs in the race were caused by wheel and engine problems; although two drivers were taken out the race due to a crash and a troublesome spindle. Other notable drivers in this race were Billy Carden, future 1955 Southern 500 winner Herb Thomas and Curtis Turner.

The lowest paid driver got $50 in winnings ($ when adjusted for inflation) while the winner received $1,000 in total prize money ($ when adjusted for inflation). NASCAR would offer a total purse of $3,900 for this racing event ($ when adjusted for inflation). The oldest car in the race was a 1947 Buick which was one of the models manufactured shortly after the end of World War II. Most of drivers on the field were driving 1950 model year vehicles with no entries from the Chevrolet manufacturer until later in the decade. Even a Cadillac vehicle made an entry in the race. This was the first race of the Grand National series to not have at least one Ford in the field.

Oldsmobile drivers would use the Oldsmobile 88 as their vehicle for this event.

Debuts and retirements
Herbert Burns, Leon Sales, Ewell Weddle, and Jerry Wimbish would introduce themselves to the NASCAR scene during this race while Jack Carr and Tex Keene would retire from NASCAR after this race.

Results

Race summary
 Lead changes: 5
 Cautions: N/A
 Red flags: N/A
 Time of race: N/A
 Average speed: N/A
 Margin of Victory: N/A

Timeline
Section reference:

References

Wilkes 200
Wilkes 200
NASCAR races at North Wilkesboro Speedway